The Saint Andrew the Apostle Parish is a Roman Catholic Church in Bel-Air Village, Makati, Philippines. It is one of the known Modern Edifices designed by Leandro V. Locsin in Makati. It is dedicated to St. Andrew the Apostle, the patron saint of Metro Manila and Bel-Air Village. Its parish territories are Bel-Air Village and Salcedo Village in Barangay Bel-Air, Rizal Village and Santiago Village in Barangay Valenzuela, and San Miguel Village in Barangay Poblacion.

Church description 
Built by National Artist for Architecture Leandro Locsin in 1968, the design of this parish church in Bel-Air Makati is symbolic of the manner the martyr died crucified on an X-shaped cross. The butterfly shaped floor plan emanates from this cruciform.
Many other symbolic features mark the tent-like structure, including the giant chandelier over the altar which serves as a halo over the copper cross by National Artist for Visual Art, Vicente Manansala.

History 
The proposal of St. Andrew the Apostle Parish began in 1965 when a group of residents belonging to the villages of San Miguel and Bel-Air dreamed of having a parish that they could call their own.

The community did not have to wait long. Don Andrés Soriano Jr. offered to have a church built in honor of his late father Don Andres Sr. who was loved and respected by the people of San Miguel Corporation. Thus, the parish was named after the patriarch's namesake, St. Andrew the Apostle.

With the approval of the establishment and formation of the parish by Rufino Cardinal Santos came the appointment of Msgr. Emilio Bularan as the first Parish Priest.

On February 8, 1967, the 69th birth anniversary of the late Don Andres Soriano, the cornerstone was laid at the  lot donated by the Ayala family through the Makati Development Corporation.

On November 30, 1968, St. Andrew the Apostle Parish was opened. At half past eight in the morning, the community gathered to witness the unveiling of the church marker by the people whose generosity made the occasion possible: Andres Soriano Jr., President of San Miguel Corporation; Jose Ma. Soriano, chairman and President of A. Soriano y Cia; Enrique Zobel, President of the Ayala Corporation; and other donors from Roxas y Cia.

In 2002, Msgr. Emmanuel Sunga made some various redevelopments in the Parish such as the improvement of flooring, air-conditioning, building of Parish Office annex, refurbishment of halo chandelier, the Altar of the Church, and Building of the Carillon Bell Tower.

Pastors

Other present priests

Former priests 
* not yet complete

Gallery

References

External links 

Roman Catholic churches in Metro Manila
Buildings and structures in Makati
Roman Catholic churches completed in 1968
1968 establishments in the Philippines
National Cultural Treasures of the Philippines
Works of National Artists of the Philippines
Leandro Locsin buildings
Modernist architecture in the Philippines
20th-century Roman Catholic church buildings in the Philippines
Churches in the Roman Catholic Archdiocese of Manila